Michael Peri (born 1967) was a Military Intelligence Electronic Warfare Signals Analyst for the United States Army during the Cold War, who was convicted of espionage in 1989 and sentenced to 30 years in prison.

Biography
On February 20, 1989, Peri vanished from the 11th Armored Cavalry Regiment (ACR) in Fulda, West Germany. An exhaustive search was conducted to locate him when it was discovered that he had stolen a portable computer that was used to store classified military defense plans. Peri was not found, although it was suspected that he had defected to East Germany when a Humvee that he had stolen was located near the East German border. 

Eleven days later, for reasons that have never been fully explained, Peri turned himself in at the front gate of the 11th ACR. He was greeted at HQ by Col Abrams and arrested by Military Police SPC Shull. He was court-martialed for espionage, where he was convicted on June 25, 1989, and sentenced to 30 years. Even after the conclusion of the court-martial, investigators were perplexed at what had caused this strange turn of events. Peri had twice been nominated for a "Soldier of the Month" award in his unit. During interrogation, Peri admitted he felt overworked and taken for granted by his superior officers. Other soldiers who were interrogated said Peri was often seen with an attractive woman whom they believed to be an East German agent. The woman whom he had been fraternizing with likely exploited his dissatisfaction with the Army to entice him to defecting to East Germany. Peri's voluntary return to West Germany and his surrender to the U.S. Military Police was most likely due to him being overcome by a guilty conscience for a rash decision.

See also
James Hall III – an Army warrant officer and intelligence analyst in Germany who sold eavesdropping and code secrets to East Germany and the Soviet Union from 1983 to 1988.
George Trofimoff – a then retired Army Reserve colonel, who was charged in June 2000 with spying for the KGB and the Russian Foreign Intelligence Service (or SVR) for over 25 years.
John Anthony Walker – an American communications specialist who was convicted of spying
Aldrich Ames - an ex-CIA agent convicted of spying for Russia
Noshir Gowadia - an ex-employee of Northrop who sold classified B2 stealth technology to China
William Kampiles - a CIA employee who was convicted of selling a classified KH-11 spy satellite manual to the Soviet Union

References

Further reading
 Missing Southland Soldier Returns to His Base in Germany (HTML). latimes.com. Retrieved 1 March 2012.
 From Soldier to Spy: A Baffling About-Face (HTML). latimes.com. Retrieved 1 March 2012.
 O.C. Soldier Led Unusual Life : Peri as Spy: Unbelievable to Those Who Knew Him (HTML). latimes.com. Retrieved 1 March 2012.

Living people
1967 births
American people convicted of spying for the Soviet Union
United States Army personnel who were court-martialed
1989 in politics